Phil Jones (born c. 1946) is a former American football coach. He served as a head coach at Shorter University from 2005 to 2015 and at several high schools across Georgia from 1973 through 1997 before he moved to the college ranks. After he served in assistant positions at Georgia, SMU and Gardner–Webb before he was hired in July 2004 to serve as the first head coach in the history of the Shorter Hawks football program.

Head coaching record

College

References

1946 births
Living people
Gardner–Webb Runnin' Bulldogs football coaches
Georgia Bulldogs football coaches
Shorter Hawks football coaches
SMU Mustangs football coaches
High school football coaches in Georgia (U.S. state)
Mercer University alumni
People from Thomaston, Georgia